Christa Castro is a Honduran politician. She serves as Honduras's Minister of Communication and Government Strategy.

References

Living people
Government ministers of Honduras
Women government ministers of Honduras
Year of birth missing (living people)
Place of birth missing (living people)
21st-century Honduran women politicians
21st-century Honduran politicians